The performative turn is a paradigmatic shift in the humanities and social sciences that has affected such disciplines as anthropology, archaeology, linguistics, ethnography, history and the relatively young discipline of performance studies. Central to the performative turn is the concept of performance.

The performative turn
Previously used as a metaphor for theatricality, performance is now often employed as a heuristic principle to understand human behaviour. The assumption is that all human practices are 'performed', so that any action at whatever moment or location can be seen as a public presentation of the self. This methodological approach entered the social sciences and humanities in the 1990s but is rooted in the 1940s and 1950s.
Underlying the performative turn was the need to conceptualize how human practices relate to their contexts in a way that went beyond the traditional sociological methods that did not problematize representation. Instead of focusing solely on given symbolic structures and texts, scholars stress the active, social construction of reality as well as the way that individual behaviour is determined by the context in which it occurs. Performance functions both as a metaphor and an analytical tool and thus provides a perspective for framing and analysing social and cultural phenomena.

What is performance?
Performance is a bodily practice that produces meaning. It is the presentation or 're-actualization' of symbolic systems through living bodies as well as lifeless mediating objects, such as architecture. In the academic field, as opposed to the domain of the performing arts, the concept of performance is generally used to highlight dynamic interactions between social actors or between a social actor and their immediate environment.  

Performance is an equivocal concept and for the purpose of analysis it is useful to distinguish between two senses of 'performance'. 
In the more formal sense, performance refers to a framed event. Performance in this sense is an enactment out of convention and tradition. Founder of the discipline of performance studies Richard Schechner dubs this category 'is-performance'. In a weaker sense, performance refers to the informal scenarios of daily life, suggesting that everyday practices are 'performed'. Schechner called this the 'as-performance'.
Generally the performative turn is concerned with the latter, although the two senses of performance should be seen as ends of a spectrum rather than distinct categories.

Context

Origins
The origins of the performative turn can be traced back to two strands of theorizing about performance as a social category that surfaced in the 1940s and 1950s. 
The first strand is anthropological in origin and may be labelled the dramaturgical model. Kenneth Burke (1945) expounded a 'dramatistic approach' to analyse the motives underlying such phenomena as communicative actions and the history of philosophy. Anthropologist Victor Turner focussed on cultural expression in staged theatre and ritual. In his highly influential The Presentation of Self in Everyday Life (1959), Erving Goffman emphasized the link between social life and performance by stating that 'the theatre of performances is in public acts'. Within the performative turn, the dramaturgical model evolved from the classical concept of 'society as theatre' into a broader category that considers all culture as performance. 
 
The second strand of theory concerns a development in the philosophy of language launched by John Austin in the 1950s. In How to do things with words he introduced the concept of the 'performative utterance', opposing the prevalent principle that declarative sentences are always statements that can be either true or false. Instead he argued that 'to say something is to do something'. In the 1960s John Searle extended this concept to the broader field of speech act theory, where due attention is paid to the use and function of language. In the 1970s Searle engaged in polemics with postmodern philosopher Jacques Derrida, about the determinability of context and the nature of authorial intentions in a performative text.

Postmodernism
The performative turn is anchored in the broader cultural development of postmodernism. An influential current in modern thought, postmodernism is a radical reappraisal of the assumed certainty and objectivity of scientific efforts to represent and explain reality. 
Postmodern scholars argue that society itself both defines and constructs reality through experience, representation and performance. From the 1970s onwards, the concept of performance was integrated into a variety of theories in the humanities and social sciences, such as phenomenology, critical theory (the Frankfurt school), semiotics, Lacanian psychoanalysis, deconstructionism and feminism. The conceptual shift became manifest in a methodology oriented towards culture as a dynamic phenomenon as well as in the focus on subjects of study that were neglected before, such as everyday life. For scholars, the concept of performance is a means to come to grips with human agency and to better understand the way social life is constructed.

Elaborations and related concepts
The concept of performance has been developed by such scholars as Richard Schechner, Victor Turner, Clifford Geertz, Erving Goffman, John Austin, John Searle, Pierre Bourdieu, Stern and Henderson, and Judith Butler.

Performance studies
Performance studies emerged through the work of, among others, theatre director and scholar Richard Schechner, who applied the notion of performance to human behaviour beyond the performing arts. His interpretation of performance as non-artistic yet expressive social behaviour and his collaboration in 1985 with anthropologist Victor Turner led to the beginning of performance studies as a separate discipline. Schechner defines performance as 'restored behaviour', to emphasize the symbolic and coded aspects of culture. Schechner understands performance as a continuum. Not everything is meant to be a performance, but everything, from performing arts to politics and economics, can be studied as performance.

Performativity
A related concept that emphasizes the political aspect of performance and its exercise of power is performativity. It is associated with philosopher and gender theorist Judith Butler. It is an anti-essentialist theory of subjectivity in which a performance of the self is repeated and dependent upon a social audience.  In this way, these unfixed and precarious performances come to have the appearance of substance and continuity.  A key theoretical point that was most radical in regards to theories of subjectivity and performance is that there is no performer behind the performance.  Butler derived this idea from Nietzsche's concept of "no doer behind the deed."  This is to say that there is no self before the performance of the self, but rather that the performance has constitutive powers.  This is how categories of the self for Judith Butler, such as gender, are seen as something that one "does," rather than something one "is."

Habitus
In the 1970s, Pierre Bourdieu introduced the concept of 'habitus' or regulated improvisation, in a reaction against the structuralist notion of culture as a system of rules (Bourdieu 1972). Culture in his perspective undergoes a shift from 'a productive to a reproductive social order in which simulations and models constitute the world so that the distinction between real and appearance becomes erased'. Though Bourdieu himself does not often employ the term 'performance', the notion of the bodily habitus as a formative site has been a source of inspiration for performance theorists.

Occasionalism
The cultural historian Peter Burke suggested using the term 'occasionalism' to stress the implication of the idea of performance that '[...] on different occasions or in different situations the same person behaves in different ways'.

Non-representational theory
Within the social sciences and humanities, an interdisciplinary strand that has contributed to the performative turn is non-representational theory. It is a 'theory of practices' that focuses on repetitive ways of expression, such as speech and gestures. As opposed to representational theory, it argues that human conduct is a result of linguistic interplay rather than of codes and symbols that are consciously planned. Non-representational theory interprets actions and events, such as dance or theatre, as actualisations of knowledge. It also intends to shift the focus away from the technical aspects of representation, to the practice itself.

Issues and debates
Despite cogent attempts at definition, the concept of performance continues to be plagued by ambiguities. Most pressing seems to be the paradox between performance as the consequence of following a script (cf. Schechners restored behaviour) and performance as a fluid activity with ample room for improvisation. Another problem involves the discrepancy between performance as a human activity that constructs culture (e.g. Butler and Derrida) on the one hand and performance as a representation of culture on the other (e.g. Bourdieu and Schechner). Another issue, important to pioneers such as Austin but now deemed irrelevant by postmodernism, concerns the sincerity of the actor. Can performance be authentic, or is it a product of pretence?

Examples and manifestations
Performance offers a tremendous interdisciplinary archive of social practices. It offers methods to study such phenomena as body art, ecological theatre, multimedia performance and other kinds of performance arts. 
 
Performance also provides a new registry of kinaesthetic effects, enabling a more conscientious observation of the moving body. The changing experience of movement, for example as a result of new technologies, has become an important subject of research. 
 
Moreover, the performative turn has helped scholars to develop an awareness of the relations between everyday life and stage performances. For example, at conferences and lectures, on the street and in other places where people speak in public, performers tend to use techniques derived from the world of theatre and dance. 
 
Performance allows us to study nature and other apparently 'immovable' and 'objectified' elements of the human environment (e.g. architecture) as active agents, rather than only as passive objects. Thus, in recent decades environmental scholars have acknowledged the existence of a fluid interaction between man and nature. 
 
The performative turn has provided additional tools to study everyday life. A household for example may be considered as a performance, in which the relation between wife and husband is a role play between two actors.

See also
 Dramaturgy (sociology)
 Erving Goffman
 Frame analysis
 John Searle
 Performance
 Performance studies
 Performative text
 Performative utterances
 Performativity
 Speech act

Notes

References
 Austin, John, How to do things with words (Cambridge 1962).
 Bamberg, M., Narrative. State of the Art (2007). 
 Bourdieu, P., Outlines of a Theory of Practice (Cambridge 1972). 
 Burke, Peter, 'Performing history: the importance of occasions' in: Rethinking history 9 afl. 1 (2005), pp. 35-52. 
 Butler, Judith, "Critically Queer", in: Identity: A Reader. (London 2000). 
 Butler, Judith, Excitable speech, a politics of the performative (New York 1997). 
 Carlson, M., Performance: A Critical Introduction (London 1996). 
 Chaney, D., Fictions of Collective Life (London 1993).
 Crane, M. T. 'What was performance?' in: Criticism 43, afl. 2 (2001), pp. 169-187 
 Davidson, M., Ghostlier Demarcations. Modern Poetry and the Material Word (Berkeley 1997). 
 Dirksmeier, P & I. Helbrecht, 'Time, Non-representational Theory and the "Performative Turn"—Towards a New Methodology in Qualitative Social Research', Forum: Qualitative Social Research 9 (2008) p. 1-24.
 Davis, T. C., The Cambridge Companion to Performance Studies (Illinois 2008). 
 Farnell, B., 'Moving Bodies: acting selves', Annual Review in Anthropology 28 (1999) p. 341-373. 
 Geertz, C., Negara: the Theatre State in Nineteenth-Century Bali (Princeton 1980). 
 Goffman, Erving, The Presentation of Self in Everyday Life (New York 1959). 
 Green, B., Spectacular Confession: Autobiography, Performative Activism and the Sites of Suffrage, 1905-1938 (London 1997). 
 Hymes, D., 'Breakthrough into performance' in: D. Ben-Amos and K.S. Goldstein (eds.) Folklore: Performance and Communication (The Hague 1975) 
 Ingold, T., 'The temporality of Landscape'. World Archeology 25 (1993) 152-174.
 Kapchan, D., 'Performance' in: Journal of American Folklore 108, pp. 479-508. 
 McKenzie, J., 'Performance studies', The Johns Hopkins Guide to Literary Theory and Criticism (2005)
 Porter, J.N., 'Review Postmodernism by Mike Featherstone', Contemporary sociology 19 (1990) 323.
 Schechner, Richard, Performance Studies. An Introduction (New York 2006). 
 Schieffelin, E., 'Problematising Performance', in: Hughes-Freeland, F., (ed) Ritual, Performance, Media (London 1998) p. 194-207. 
 Stern and Henderson, Performance: Texts and Contexts (Londen 1993). 
 Thrift, N. en J. Dewsbury, 'Dead geographies – and how to make them live', Environment and Planning D: Society and Space 18 (2000) p. 411-432. 
 Thrift, N. J., 'The still point: resistance, expressive embodiment and dance', in: Pile, S., (ed) Geographies of Resistance (London 1997), p. 125-151. 
 Thrift, N. J., Spatial Formations (London 1996). 
 Weiss, B., The Making and Unmaking of the Haya Lived World: Consumption, Commodization, and Everyday Practise (Durham 1996). 
 Wells, P., Understanding Animation (London 1998).

External links
 Performance and architecture
 Performance and collective action

Postmodernism